Ring of Saturn is an extended play by Goldie released on 23 November 1998.

Track listing

References

1998 albums
Goldie albums